Middle Widows Peak is a summit in the U.S. state of Nevada.

Middle Peak was so named on account of its central location relative to nearby mountains.

References

Mountains of Clark County, Nevada